Maurice Pefferkorn (Moreuil, 23 July 1884 – Paris, 8 August 1953) was a French sports journalist and writer. He specialized in association football.

He was an engineer by training, graduated from the Industrial Institute of the North (current Lille Central School), class of 1907. He was notably a sports columnist for the right-wing nationalist newspaper Candide. He wrote several books on football, the Olympic Games, and athletic sport. He is the winner of the Grand Prize for Sports Literature.

References

External links
 Jacques Gleyse, Dominique Jorand et Céline Garcia, "Mystique de gauche et mystique de droite en éducation physique en France sous la Troisième République", site Recherches Université de Montpellier 3

1884 births
French journalists
École centrale de Lille alumni
1953 deaths